Archibald Kennedy, 1st Marquess of Ailsa, KT, FRS (February 1770 – 8 September 1846), styled Lord Kennedy between 1792 and 1794 and known as the Earl of Cassilis between 1794 and 1831, was a Scottish peer.

Early life
Kennedy was the eldest son of Archibald Kennedy, 11th Earl of Cassilis, by Anne, daughter of John Watts and descendant of the Schuyler family, the Van Cortlandt family (including Stephanus Van Cortlandt), and the Delancey family of British North America. He became known by the courtesy title Lord Kennedy when his father succeeded to the earldom of Cassilis in 1792.

Career
Kennedy succeeded to the earldom on the death of his father 30 December 1794. He sat in the House of Lords as a Scottish Representative Peer between 1796 and 1806. In the latter year, he was created Baron Ailsa, of Ailsa in the County of Ayr, in the Peerage of the United Kingdom, which entitled him to an automatic seat in the House of Lords. He was admitted a Fellow of the Royal Society on 18 February 1819. In 1831 he was created Marquess of Ailsa, of the Isle of Ailsa in the County of Ayr. He voted for the Reform Bill in 1832. In 1820, King George IV made Archibald. a knight of the Order of the Thistle. This was an achievement that Sir Archibald had coveted for some time.

He had a taste for gambling. He owned racehorses and raced many that won cups in 1801 and 1802. He owned Clementina, Scaramouche, Pegasus, Chancellor, and Trimmer. He and 13 others established the Ayr Gold Cup held annually with only Scottish-trained horses that raced over a 2-mile run.

Personal life
Lord Ailsa married Margaret Erskine, the second daughter of Mary ( Baird) Erskine and John Erskine of Dun, Forfarshire, on 1 June 1793. They had six children:

 Archibald Kennedy, Earl of Cassilis (1794–1832), who married Eleanor Allardyce and had issue.
 Lady Anne Kennedy (1798–1877), who married Sir David Baird of Newbyth, 2nd Baronet and had issue.
 Lady Margaret Kennedy (1800–1889), who married Thomas Radclyffe-Livingstone-Eyre.
 Lady Mary Kennedy (1800–1886), who married Richard Oswald, son of Richard Alexander Oswald, MP for Ayr of Auchencruive Estate.
 The Hon. John Kennedy-Erskine (1802–1831), who married Lady Augusta FitzClarence, an illegitimate daughter of King William IV and Dorothy Jordan and had issue (their granddaughter was the writer and poet Violet Jacob). John Kennedy-Erskine assumed the additional name of Erskine on being named heir to the House of Dun.
 Lady Alicia Jane Kennedy (1805–1887), who married Jonathan Peel, Secretary of State for War, and had issue.

Lord Ailsa died in 1846 and was succeeded by his grandson, Archibald Kennedy.

Legacy
Lord Ailsa bought a house near Twickenham in London that had previously belonged to the playwright Richard Brinsley Sheridan. He named it "St Margaret's" and the name of the house has now been applied to the whole adjacent area. Ailsa Road and Ailsa Avenue in the area are also named after him.

References

External links

Archibald Kennedy, 1st Marquess of Ailsa and 12th Earl of Cassilis at The British Museum

1770 births
1846 deaths
Fellows of the Royal Society
Knights of the Thistle
Scottish representative peers
Archibald
Scottish people of Dutch descent
Scottish people of German descent
Schuyler family
Van Cortlandt family
1
Peers of the United Kingdom created by William IV